Alocasia micholitziana, commonly known as the green velvet taro or green velvet alocasia, is a plant in the family Araceae. It is endemic to the island of Luzon in the Philippines. It is commonly grown as an ornamental plant worldwide.

Taxonomy and etymology
The species was first described by Henry Frederick Conrad Sander in 1912. It is named after the German plant collector Wilhelm Micholitz.

Description
It has 4 to 7 leaves. The leaf blades are a deep matte green in color with a velvety texture on the upper surface, and a paler green on the lower surface. The leaf veins are white in color on the upper surface. The leaf margins are strongly to mildly undulate. It is shallowly peltate.

The spadix is shorter than the spathe and cream-colored.

Distribution and habitat
Alocasia micholitziana is endemic to Apayao, Benguet and Ifugao in northern Luzon in the Philippines. It grows in shady areas in damp lowland forests.

Uses
The plant is easily propagated by stem cuttings and seeds and is a popular ornamental in both the local and international markets. It has produced several cultivars, the most popular of which is Alocasia micholitziana 'Frydek'.

Conservation
Alocasia micholitziana was formerly common in its native range but is now rare due to overcollection. It is classified as vulnerable in the wild by the International Union for Conservation of Nature. Harvesting wild specimens of A. micholitziana is illegal in the Philippines and is punishable with six to ten years imprisonment and a fine of ₱100,000 to ₱1,000,000.

See also
Alocasia sanderiana
Alocasia nycteris
Alocasia sinuata
Alocasia zebrina
Alocasia heterophylla
List of threatened species of the Philippines

References

micholitziana
Endemic flora of the Philippines
Flora of Luzon
Garden plants of Asia
House plants
Taxa named by Henry Frederick Conrad Sander
Plants described in 1912